Wallhausen is a municipality in the district of Schwäbisch Hall in Baden-Württemberg in Germany.

It contained the village of Hengstfeld and its hamlets of Asbach, Roßbürg and Schönbronn, incorporated into Wallhausen on July 1, 1974.

References

Schwäbisch Hall (district)